The CNIB Chanchlani Global Vision Research Award is an annual global research award that promotes vital world-class research to explore the causes of blindness and vision loss, as well as potential cures, treatments and preventions. The award of $25,000 is given to vision scientists around the world who have made a major, original contribution for advancement in above said fields.

The award was established in 2011 by Vasu and wife Jaya Chanchlani in collaboration with CNIB (Canadian National Institute for the Blind), the Toronto Netralya Lions Club and the Toronto Doctors Lions Club. The $500,000 endowment established with Mr. Chanchlani’s significant financial support, the awards promotes first-class global research of vision science and vision rehabilitation.

Award Recipients 
 2016 - Dr Robert Molday 

Dr Molday is Professor of Biochemistry & Molecular Biology and Ophthalmology & Visual Sciences, University of British Columbia

 2014 - Jayakrishna Ambati 

Dr Ambati is Professor and Vice-Chair for Research of Ophthalmology and Founding Director of the Center for Advanced Vision Science at the University of Virginia.

 2012 - Professor Hugh R. Taylor 

Taylor is Melbourne Laureate Professor at the University of Melbourne and Chair of Indigenous Eye Health, where he was formerly Professor of Ophthalmology and department head and is founder of the Centre for Eye Research Australia. He is the Vice President of the International Agency for the Prevention of Blindness and Treasurer of the International Council of Ophthalmology.

See also

 List of medicine awards

Notes 

Academic awards
Canadian awards
Medicine awards
Lions Clubs International
Awards established in 2011